Davis Creek is a stream in the U.S. state of Washington. It is a tributary of Pend Oreille River.

Davis Creek bears the name of a local early settler.

See also
List of rivers of Washington

References

Rivers of Pend Oreille County, Washington
Rivers of Washington (state)